A dream dictionary (also known as oneirocritic literature) is a tool made for interpreting images in a dream. Dream dictionaries tend to include specific images which are attached to specific interpretations. However, dream dictionaries are generally not considered scientifically viable by those within the psychology community.

History
Since the 19th century, the art of dream interpretation has been transferred to a scientific ground, making it a distinct part of psychology. However, the dream symbols of the "unscientific" days—the outcome of hearsay interpretations that differ around the world among different cultures—continued to mark the day of an average human-being, who is most likely unfamiliar with Freudian analysis of dreams.

The dream dictionary includes interpretations of dreams, giving each symbol in a dream a specific meaning. The argument of what dreams represent has greatly changed over time. With this changing, so have the interpretation of dreams. Dream dictionaries have changed in content since they were first published. The Greeks and Romans saw dreams as having a religious meaning. This made them believe that their dreams were an insight into the future and held the key to the solutions of their problems. Aristotle's view on dreams were that they were merely a function of our physiological make up. He did not believe dreams have a greater meaning, solely that they're the result of how we sleep. In the Middle Ages, dreams were seen as an interpretation of good or evil.

Although the dream dictionary is not recognized in the psychology world, Freud is said to have revolutionized the interpretation and study of dreams. Freud came to the conclusion that dreams were a form of wish fulfillment. Dream dictionaries were first based upon Freudian thoughts and ancient interpretations of dreams.

Some examples of dream interpretation are: dreaming you are on a beach means you are facing negativity in your life, or a lion may represent a need to control others. Dream dictionaries typically hold interpretations ranging from A-Z. Dream dictionaries can be found in book form or on the internet.

See also
 Dream interpretation
 Dream journal
 Dream sharing
 Oneiromancy
 Psychoanalytic dream interpretation
 Recurring dream

References

Further reading
 Condron, Barbara (1994). The Dreamer's Dictionary. School of Metaphysics Publishing. 
 Crisp, Tony (2002). Dream Dictionary: An A to Z Guide to Understanding Your Unconscious Mind. 
 Freud, Sigmund (1980). The Interpretation of Dreams, Avon.
 Guiley, Rsemary Ellen (1995). The Encyclopedia of Dreams.  
 Hadfield, J. A. (1954). Dreams and Nightmares, Penguin.
 Jung, Carl (1964). "Man and His Symbols", Doubleday.
 MacKenzie, Norman (1989). "Dreams and Dreaming", Bloomsbury Books.
 Van de Castle, Robert (1994). "Our Dreaming Mind", Aquarian.

External links
 Dream Dictionary 
 Dream Dictionary A-Z 
 

Dictionary
Symbols
Dictionaries by type